Leif Nilsson (born 16 November 1952) is a Swedish weightlifter. He competed at the 1976 Summer Olympics and the 1980 Summer Olympics. He won goldmedal in snatch 175 kg at world championship 1978 in Gettysburg, 4th place in total 387,5 kg.

References

External links
 

1952 births
Living people
Swedish male weightlifters
Olympic weightlifters of Sweden
Weightlifters at the 1976 Summer Olympics
Weightlifters at the 1980 Summer Olympics
People from Hässleholm Municipality
World Weightlifting Championships medalists
Sportspeople from Skåne County
20th-century Swedish people
21st-century Swedish people